Lord Jeff is a 1938 MGM film, set in England, starring Freddie Bartholomew as a spoiled orphan who has gotten mixed up with some crooks, but gets set straight by a stint in a mercantile marine vocational school for orphaned boys.

Plot
Young "Lord" Geoffrey Braemer (Freddie Bartholomew) is supposedly an English aristocrat. In fact, he is an orphan and willing accomplice to con artists Jim Hampstead (George Zucco) and Doris Clandon (Gale Sondergaard), who took him in when his parents died in a train wreck. He conveniently faints in a jewelry store, distracting the employees and allowing Jim to steal a valuable necklace. However, an astute insurance investigator catches him. He is sent to Russell-Cotes, a mercantile marine school, one of many vocational schools run by Dr. Barnardo's home for orphaned boys, with the warning that if he does not behave himself, he will be transferred to a reformatory.

The school is headed by Captain Briggs (Charles Coburn). Briggs assigns longtime "honor boy" Terry O'Mulvaney (Mickey Rooney) to take Geoff under his wing. Despite excelling in sea knowledge from his previous education, Geoff is not interested in fitting in; he only wants to return to London to be reunited with Doris and Jim, although he waits in vain for a letter from them. He antagonizes all of the other boys, with the exception of the irrepressibly cheerful Albert Baker (Terry Kilburn).

When the boys are given liberty at a banquet in the town, Geoff uses the opportunity to run away. Terry tracks him down and, after a fight, takes him back to school. Unfortunately, it is very late, and Terry is caught sneaking into the dormitory. When he refuses to inform on Geoff to excuse his actions, he is stripped of his rank and, worse, loses his chance of getting one of five coveted jobs offered the boys on the luxury liner RMS Queen Mary. Geoff smugly refuses to reveal his part, angering the other boys, who "put the chill" on him, refusing to speak to him at all.

The bleak isolation of not being spoken to by the other boys takes its toll on Geoff, although he doesn't want to show it. He learns several life lessons under the mentoring of kindly and wise instructor "Crusty" Jelks (Herbert Mundin). Geoff confesses his runaway attempt to Captain Briggs, knowing it could mean being sent to the reformatory, so that Terry might possibly be reinstated for the Queen Mary. He asks Captain Briggs not to tell the boys that the information clearing Terry came from him.

When Doris and Jim finally manage to contact Geoff, he refuses to go back to his crooked life, and tells them he is going to sail on the Queen Mary. Since the stolen necklace is too well known in England, Jim sews it inside Geoff's coat when Geoff is not looking, and books passage aboard the Queen Mary, bound for America. Briggs selects Terry and Geoff to join the crew of the Queen Mary. The necklace is found at the school, forcing Geoff to choose between conflicting loyalties. He chooses wisely, but Doris and Jim are nowhere to be found. Geoff is taken in for questioning by the police, meaning he will miss the sea voyage. Luckily, one of his schoolmates recognizes the crooked couple on the Queen Mary, and they are arrested in time for Geoff to board the ship and join Terry.

Cast
 Freddie Bartholomew as Geoffrey Braemer
 Mickey Rooney as Terry O'Mulvaney
 Charles Coburn as Captain Briggs
 Herbert Mundin as Bosun "Crusty" Jelks
 Terry Kilburn as Albert Baker
 Gale Sondergaard as Doris Clandon
 Peter Lawford as Benny Potter
 Walter Tetley as Tommy Thrums
 Peter Ellis as Ned Saunders
 George Zucco as Jim Hampstead
 Matthew Boulton as Inspector Scott
 John Burton as John Cartwright
 Emma Dunn as Mrs. Briggs
 Monty Woolley as Jeweler
 Gilbert Emery as Magistrate
 Charles Irwin as Mr. Burke
 Walter Kingsford as Superintendent

References

External links
 
 
 
 

1938 films
1930s teen films
American black-and-white films
American coming-of-age films
American crime films
Films about con artists
Films about friendship
Films about orphans
Films directed by Sam Wood
Metro-Goldwyn-Mayer films
Films set in London
Films scored by Edward Ward (composer)
1930s crime films
1930s American films